Warren County is a rural county located in the U.S. state of Iowa. As of the 2020 census, the population was 52,403. The county seat is Indianola.

Warren County is included in the Des Moines–West Des Moines, IA Metropolitan Statistical Area.

History
Warren County was formed in 1846. It was named after General Joseph Warren, a hero in the American Revolutionary War.  The present Warren County Court House was opened in 1939.

Geography

Major highways

 Interstate 35
 U.S. Highway 65
 U.S. Highway 69
 Iowa Highway 5
 Iowa Highway 28
 Iowa Highway 92
 Iowa Highway 316

Adjacent counties
Polk County  (north)
Marion County  (east)
Lucas County  (southeast)
Clarke County  (southwest)
Madison County  (west)

Demographics

2020 census
There were 20,857 housing units, of which 19,616 were occupied.

2010 census
There were 18,371 housing units, of which 17,262 were occupied.

2000 census

At the 2000 census there were 40,671 people, 14,708 households, and 11,207 families in the county. There were 15,289 housing units at an average density of 27 per square mile (10/km2). The racial makeup of the county was 98.08% White, 0.27% Black or African American, 0.17% Native American, 0.38% Asian, 0.04% Pacific Islander, 0.29% from other races, and 0.76% from two or more races.  1.08%. were Hispanic or Latino of any race.

Of the 14,708 households 37.80% had children under the age of 18 living with them, 64.50% were married couples living together, 8.80% had a female householder with no husband present, and 23.80% were non-families. 19.90% of households were one person and 8.70% were one person aged 65 or older.  The average household size was 2.65 and the average family size was 3.05.

The age distribution was 27.00% under the age of 18, 9.70% from 18 to 24, 28.20% from 25 to 44, 23.20% from 45 to 64, and 11.80% 65 or older.  The median age was 36 years. For every 100 females, there were 94.60 males.  For every 100 females age 18 and over, there were 91.80 males.

The median household income was $50,349 and the median family income  was $56,344. Males had a median income of $36,983 versus $26,768 for females. The per capita income for the county was $20,558.  About 3.70% of families and 5.10% of the population were below the poverty line, including 6.40% of those under age 18 and 5.20% of those age 65 or over.

Communities

Cities

Ackworth
Bevington
Carlisle
Cumming
Des Moines
Hartford
Indianola
Lacona
Martensdale
Milo
New Virginia
Norwalk
Sandyville
Spring Hill
St. Marys
West Des Moines

Unincorporated communities
Beech
Churchville
Cool
Liberty Center
Prole
Ourtown E&J.L.B.A’s

Townships
Warren County has sixteen townships:

Allen
Belmont
Greenfield
Jackson
Jefferson
Liberty
Lincoln
Linn
Otter
Palmyra
Richland
Squaw
Union
Virginia
White Breast
White Oak

Population ranking
The population ranking of the following table is based on the 2020 census of Warren County.

† county seat

Politics

See also

National Register of Historic Places listings in Warren County, Iowa

References

Further reading
 Beatty, Jerry K.  Patriotism, Courage, & Sacrifice: Warren County's Response to WW II (Indianola: Warren County Historical Society, 2017). 401 pp online review

External links

Official Warren County website

 
1846 establishments in Iowa Territory
Des Moines metropolitan area
Populated places established in 1846